Donald Ferguson (April 28, 1921 – August 15, 1985) was an American cyclist. He competed in the tandem event at the 1956 Summer Olympics.

References

External links
 

1921 births
1985 deaths
American male cyclists
Olympic cyclists of the United States
Cyclists at the 1956 Summer Olympics
Sportspeople from Evanston, Illinois
Cyclists from Illinois